The Garden of the Blues is a live album by jazz vocalist/pianist Shirley Horn, performing the compositions of Curtis Lewis, which was recorded in Florida in 1984 and released on the Danish SteepleChase label.

Reception

In his review for AllMusic, Ken Dryden commented: "Horn is in top form throughout the concert, with her soft, thoughtful vocals accompanied by her sensitive and sometimes swinging piano".

Track listing
All compositions by Curtis Lewis except where noted
 Introduction – 0:24
 "He's Gone Again" (Curtis Lewis, Curley Hamner, Gladys Hampton) – 6:10
 "Old Country" (Lewis, Nat Adderley) – 4:59
 "Roaming Lover" – 5:19
 "The Garden of the Blues Suite: Blue City" – 5:48
 "The Garden of the Blues Suite: What Would a Woman Do?" – 4:48
 "The Garden of the Blues Suite: He Never Mentioned Love" – 6:57
 "The Garden of the Blues Suite: The Great City" – 3:56

Personnel
Shirley Horn – vocals, piano
Charles Ables – electric bass
Steve Williams – drums

References

1985 live albums
Shirley Horn live albums
SteepleChase Records live albums